Vangelis Peter Haritatos (born 8 April 1986) is a Zimbabwean businessman and politician who has served as Deputy Minister for Lands, Agriculture, Water, Climate and Rural Resettlement and a Member of the National Assembly of Zimbabwe for Muzvezve since 2018. Haritatos is a member of the ruling ZANU–PF and his father, Peter Haritatos, was previously an MP for the same party.

Early life and education
Haritatos was born on 8 April 1986 at the Redcliffe Medical Centre in Kwekwe, Zimbabwe.  His father emigrated from Greece in the 1950s. He attended Eiffel Flats Primary School, Jameson High School and Harare International School. He studied at the John Cabot University in Italy, majoring in international affairs and international economics. During the same period, he fulfilled a joint programme with the University of Wales. He graduated from Kansas State University in the United States in 2007 with a Bachelor of Arts degree in politics and a Bachelor of Science degree in economics. Haritatos also studied for a degree in business administration.

Political career
Haritatos has been a member of the ZANU–PF since 2002 and has been involved with the party's youth league. He was made the district youth secretary for transport of ward 13 of the now-defunct Mhondoro constituency in 2007. In 2008, he was named the deputy youth secretary of lands of the Mashonaland West Province as he became part of the provincial committee. He was promoted to the post of provincial youth finance secretary in 2009 and served in the post until 2013.

In 2018, his father Peter, incumbent MP for Muzvezve, decided against running for re-election and Haritatos was chosen as the ZANU–PF candidate, winning in a landslide on 30 July 2018. He was sworn in as a Member of Parliament on 5 September and was selected as the Deputy Minister for Lands, Agriculture, Water, Climate and Rural Resettlement on 11 September by President Emmerson Mnangagwa.

Personal life
Haritatos resides in Kadoma with his wife and children. He formerly ran a bakery and confectionery shop.

References

External links
Hon Haritatos Vangelis Peter – Parliament of Zimbabwe
Who is Who – Parliament of Zimbabwe

Living people
1986 births
20th-century Zimbabwean people
21st-century Zimbabwean politicians
Members of the National Assembly of Zimbabwe
Kansas State University alumni
People from Kadoma, Zimbabwe
People from Kwekwe
White Zimbabwean businesspeople
White Zimbabwean politicians
Zimbabwean people of Greek descent
ZANU–PF politicians